José Custodio Cayetano García Rovira (March 2, 1780 – August 8, 1816) was a Neogranadine general, statesman and painter, who fought for the independence of New Granada from Spain, and became President of the United Provinces of the New Granada in 1816. He was executed a month later during the Reconquista, at the hands of Pablo Morillo.

Education
García was the son of Juan de Dios García Navas and Rosa Rovira de García, he was born on March 2, 1780, in Bucaramanga, in the province of Socorro, part of the Viceroyalty of the New Granada, in what is now Colombia. He attended the Colegio Mayor de San Bartolomé in Santafé de Bogotá, where he graduated in 1799 with a degree in Philosophy, and in 1804 he got his degree in Civil Law, and later a Doctorate in Theology. He also attended the Saint Thomas Aquinas University where he studied Painting and Music, later receiving a degree in Fine arts; on April 29, 1809, García also received his doctorate in Law and was officially received as a lawyer by the Royal Audiency of Santafé de Bogotá. He later returned to San Bartolomé this time as a professor in the areas of Algebra, Mathematics, Trigonometry, Philosophy Metaphysics, and Ethics.

García's appetite for knowledge made him a celebrated figure in the Tertulias, and salons of the Bogotá. He formed part of the Tertulia Literaria del Buen Gusto, that was hosted in the house of doña Manuela Sanz de Santamaría de González Manrique, where many other prominent figures like Francisco José de Caldas, José Fernández Madrid, Camilo Torres Tenorio, Alexander von Humboldt, Francisco Antonio Ulloa among others. He also attended the Tertulia Eutropélica, that congregated in the house of Manuel del Socorro Rodríguez and also the Tertulia of Antonio Nariño, where they studied the ideas and works of Montesquieu, Rousseau and Voltaire.

Because of his extensive education, he was known as El Estudiante (The Student).

Political and military life
After the Revolution of July 20, 1810, García started working for the new formed government, on August he started working as a lawyer in the Appeals Tribunal of Bogotá. He was later appointed Lieutenant of the Army of Tunja, by its Governor Juan Nepomuceno Niño. He started getting involved in politics in Tunja since the Congress of the United Provinces was situated there. On July 25, 1812 he was elected governor to the Province of Socorro in a popular election.

Triumvirate
On September 23, 1814, the Neogranadine Congress, modified the Federal Act relating to the seat of power, and replaced the Presidency with a Triumvirate, a three-member executive body, to rule over the country. Congress named Manuel Rodríguez Torices, José Manuel Restrepo, and García to head this triumvirate, but because they were not present to assume power, they were temporarily replaced by José María del Castillo y Rada, Joaquín Camacho, and José Fernández Madrid. García, however, resigned before ever taking possession of the presidency on November 15, 1815, Restrepo never actually accepted the presidency either, and both were permanently replaced in 1815 by general Antonio Villavicencio, and the ex president, José Miguel Pey.

Presidential nomination
On June 22, 1816, president Fernández Madrid, arrived in Popayán after fleeing the invasion of Bogotá by Pablo Morillo, once in Popayán he presented his resignation to the Permanent Legislative Commission of Congress, then assembled in Popayán. The commission named García as President-Dictator and Liborio Mejía as Vice President, the latter, however, became the acting President while García headed toward Popayán to accept the presidency.

Marriage
García, who was leading the forces behind Fernández Madrid on his way to Popayán, was delayed in a short and unforeseen event. When Bogotá was invaded, not only the President escaped, but also did other prominent figures of the city, among them the Piedrahita Family. One of their daughters was María Josefa Piedrahita y Sáenz, known to her family and friends as "Pepita". It is not sure whether they knew each other from before, but on the way to Popayán, Pepita, of only 16 years of age, caught the attention of Custodio, and María Josefa asked to take her with him, as she would prefer to face the dangers of the jungle than to be captured by the Spaniards, their mutual affection escalated, and Custodio asked María Josefa to marry her. And so, in the mist of war, in an improvised ceremony, they got married by Friar Francisco Antonio Florido, who was also fleeing Bogotá with them.

Presidency
Short after Liborio Mejía was vested with the presidential powers, he led his small army to face Juan Sámano in the Battle of Cuchilla del Tambo which culminated with the defeat of the patriots on June 29. Liborio Mejía escaped to La Plata where he met with García and ceded the presidency  to him the next day June 30, thus assuming the presidency as first intended.

Unfortunately for both of them, and for the nation, Sámano caught on with them in La Plata, and defeated their weak outnumbered forces. They managed to escape but shortly after they were both captured and taken prisoners.

When they arrived at La Plata the small army they had left was confronted with an army of Spaniards commanded by colonel Carlos Toirá. A great effort was made to fight the Spaniards, but they were defeated on July 10, and those who managed to escape, including García, were captured a few days later. They were taken to Bogotá, and on August 8, 1816, García was executed by a firing squad in the Huerta de Jaime, now the Plaza de los Martires (Plaza of the Martyrs), his body was then hanged in the gallows, with a sign on him that read "García Rovira, el estudiante, fusilado por traidor" (es:García Rovira, the student, shot for being a traitor).

Legacy
García died at the age of 36, leaving behind his wife María Josefa Piedrahita, to whom he had only been married less than two months. After the defeat of the Spaniards years later, Santander granted pension to the widows of the martyrs of the Independence, among them Piedrahita de García.

García is highly regarded as a hero of the independence and his memory continues on, specially in the Department of Santander, where he was born and was governor of one of its provinces, the Socorro Province, which was later renamed in his honor and is now the García Rovira Province.

In Bucaramanga, where he was born, the first statue ever erected in 1907 was in his honor; it was a metal sculpture by the German artist Xavier Arnold, and it is located in the park also constructed in his honor and named Parque García Rovira, in the center of the city, right next to the City Hall.

Also in Bucaramanga, the city commemorated the ex-president and painter opening the Casa de la Cultura Custodio García Rovira, a fine arts museum that holds exhibitions of different painters.

References

1780 births
1816 deaths
People from Bucaramanga
Colombian Roman Catholics
Colombian people of Spanish descent
Presidents of Colombia
Colombian generals
People of the Colombian War of Independence
Executed military personnel
Colombian painters
Colombian governors
19th-century Colombian lawyers